The Italian ambassador in La Paz is the official representative of the Government in Rome to the Government of Bolivia.

List of representatives 
<onlyinclude>

References 

Bolivia
Italy
Bolivia–Italy relations